Williams Fieldhouse is a 2,300-seat multi-purpose arena in Platteville, Wisconsin. It is home to the NCAA Division III University of Wisconsin-Platteville Pioneers basketball team.  It opened in 1962.

The playing surface was named "Bo Ryan Court" in 2007 in honor of Bo Ryan, the coach at UW-Platteville from 1984 to 1999, who led the Pioneers to four national titles. He later coached the UW-Madison basketball team.

References

Buildings and structures in Grant County, Wisconsin
College basketball venues in the United States
Basketball venues in Wisconsin
Wisconsin–Platteville Pioneers men's basketball